This is a list of airlines in operation that offer regular (usually scheduled) service to paying passengers from the general public. This list includes some airlines that offer charter service on a regular basis between fixed destinations. It also includes some airlines in the process of formation, planning to embark upon their maiden voyage soon.

Defunct airlines are listed instead at list of defunct airlines.

List of airlines includes all airlines, including cargo, charter, and corporate carriers not listed here.


List of airlines

Africa
 : Top - A B C D E F G H I J K L M N O P Q R S T U V W X Y Z

Algeria
 Air Algérie
 Tassili Airlines

Angola

 Fly Angola 
 TAAG Angola Airlines

Benin

Botswana
 Air Botswana
 Air Daytona Airlines

Burkina Faso
 Air Burkina

Burundi

Cameroon
 Camair-co
 Arik Airlines

Cape Verde

 Cabo Verde Airlines 
 Cabo Verde Express

Chad

Comoros
 Comores Aviation

Democratic Republic of the Congo
 Air Kasaï
 Compagnie Africaine d'Aviation
 Congo Airways

Republic of the Congo
 Canadian Airways Congo 
 Equaflight
 Trans Air Congo

Côte d'Ivoire
 Air Côte d'Ivoire

Djibouti
 Air Djibouti
 Daallo Airlines

Egypt

 Air Cairo
 Air Sinai
 Alexandria Airlines
 AlMasria Universal Airlines
 AMC Airlines
 EgyptAir
 Nile Air

Equatorial Guinea
 CEIBA Intercontinental 
 Ecuato Guineana

Eritrea
 Eritrean Airlines

Ethiopia
 Ethiopian Airlines
 National Airways Ethiopia

Gabon
 Avirex Gabon

The Gambia
 Mahfooz Aviation
 Slok Air International

Ghana
 Africa World Airlines
 Gianair
 Air Ghana

Guinea
Eagle Air

Guinea-Bissau

Ivory Coast
See the section titled "Côte d'Ivoire" above.

Kenya 

 African Express Airways
 Airkenya Express
 Fly540
 Kenya Airways
 Mombasa Air Safari

Liberia
 LoneStar Airways (in formation)

Libya
 Afriqiyah Airways
 Air Libya Tibesti
 Buraq Air
 Libyan Airlines
 Libyan Wings

Madagascar
 Air Madagascar
 Tsaradia

Malawi
 Malawian Airlines

Mali
 Air Mali

Mauritania
 Mauritania Airlines International

Mauritius
 Air Mauritius

Morocco

 Casa Air Service
 Regional Air Lines
 Royal Air Maroc

Mozambique

 LAM Mozambique Airlines
 Moçambique Expresso
 Transairways

Nigeria

 Aero Contractors
 Air Peace
 Arik Air
 Azman Air
 Dana Air
 Green Africa Airways
 Kabo Air
 Max Air
 Med-View Airline
 Overland Airways

Réunion
 Air Austral

Rwanda
 RwandAir

São Tomé and Príncipe
 STP Airways

Senegal
 Air Senegal

Seychelles
 Air Seychelles

Sierra Leone
 Eagle Air

Somalia
 African Express Airways 
 Jubba Airways

South Africa

 Airlink
 CemAir
 LIFT Airline
 FlySafair
 South African Airways

Sudan

 Badr Airlines
 Mid Airlines
 Nova Airline
 Sudan Airways
 Sun Air

Tanzania
 Air Tanzania
 Precision Air
 Regional Air

Togo
 ASKY Airlines

Tunisia

 Nouvelair Tunisia
 Tunisair
 TunisAir Express
 Syphax Airlines

Uganda
 Eagle Air
 Uganda Airlines

Zambia
 Airwaves Airlink
 Proflight Zambia

Zimbabwe
 Air Zimbabwe
 Zimbabwe Airways

Asia
 : Top - A B C D E F G H I J K L M N O P Q R S T U V W X Y Z
For countries in the Middle East, refer to the section below.

Afghanistan
 Ariana Afghan Airlines
 Kam Air

Azerbaijan
 Azerbaijan Airlines
 Buta Airways

Bangladesh

 Biman Bangladesh Airlines
 NovoAir
 Regent Airways
 US-Bangla Airlines

Bhutan
 Bhutan Airlines 
 Drukair

Brunei

 RB Link
 Royal Brunei Airlines

Cambodia
 Cambodia Angkor Air
 Cambodia Airways
 JC International Airlines
 Lanmei Airlines
 Sky Angkor Airlines

China, People's Republic of

 Air Changan 
 Air China
 Air China Inner Mongolia 
 Air Guilin
 Beijing Capital Airlines
 Chengdu Airlines
 China Eastern Airlines
 China Express Airlines
 China Flying Dragon Aviation
 China Southern Airlines
 China United Airlines
 China Yunnan Airlines
 Chongqing Airlines
 Dalian Airlines
 Fuzhou Airlines
 GX Airlines 
 Hainan Airlines
 Hebei Airlines 
 Henan Airlines
 Huaxia Airlines
 Jiangxi Air
 Juneyao Airlines
 Kunming Airlines
 Lucky Air
 Okay Airways
 OTT Airlines 
 Shandong Airlines
 Shanghai Airlines
 Shenzhen Airlines
 Sichuan Airlines
 Spring Airlines
 Tianjin Airlines (merged to form Grand China Air)
 Tibet Airlines
 Urumqi Air
 West Air
 XiamenAir

Hong Kong

 Cathay Pacific
 Greater Bay Airlines
 HK Express
 Hong Kong Airlines

Macau

 Air Macau
 Jet Asia

Taiwan

 China Airlines
 Mandarin Airlines
 Tigerair Taiwan
 Daily Air
 EVA Air
 Uni Air
 Starlux Airlines

East Timor
 Air Timor

India

 Air India
 Air India Express
 AirAsia India
 Akasa Air
 Alliance Air
 Flybig
 GoAir
 IndiGo
 Jet Airways
 SpiceJet
 Star Air
 Vistara
 Zoom Air

Indonesia

 Airfast Indonesia
 Aviastar
 Batik Air
 Citilink
 Garuda Indonesia
 Indonesia Air Transport
 Indonesia AirAsia
 Jhonlin Air Transport
 Kaltim Airlines
 Lion Air
 Mimika Air
 NAM Air 
 Pelita Air
 Sriwijaya Air
 Susi Air
 Wings Air

Japan

 Air Do
 Airtransse
 All Nippon Airways
 Air Japan
 ANA Wings
 Amakusa Airlines
 Fuji Dream Airlines
 Ibex Airlines
 Japan Airlines
 Hokkaido Air System
 J-Air 
 Japan Air Commuter
 Japan Transocean Air
 Ryukyu Air Commuter
 Zipair Tokyo
 Jetstar Japan
 Kyokushin Air
 New Central Airlines
 Oriental Air Bridge
 Peach
 Skymark Airlines
 Solaseed Air
 StarFlyer

Kazakhstan

 Air Astana
 Euro-Asia Air
 FlyArystan
 SCAT Airlines
 Sunday Airlines

North Korea
 Air Koryo

South Korea

 Air Busan
 Air Premia
 Air Seoul
 Asiana Airlines
 Eastar Jet
 Fly Gangwon
 Jeju Air
 Jin Air
 Korean Air
 T'way Air

Kyrgyzstan
 Air Kyrgyzstan
 Avia Traffic Company
 Air Manas

Laos
 Lao Airlines
 Lao Skyway

Malaysia

 Air Asia
 AirAsia X
 Berjaya Air
 Firefly
 Layang Layang Aerospace
 Malaysia Airlines
 Malindo Air
 MASwings
 Sabah Air

Maldives
 FlyMe
 Maldivian
 Manta Air
 Trans Maldivian Airways

Mongolia
 Aero Mongolia
 Eznis Airways
 Hunnu Air
 MIAT Mongolian Airlines

Myanmar
 Air KBZ
 Air Thanlwin rebranded from Yangon Airways
 Asian Wings Airways
 Golden Myanmar Airlines
 Mann Yadanarpon Airlines
 Myanmar Airways International
 Myanmar National Airlines

Nepal

 Buddha Air
 Gorkha Airlines
 Himalaya Airlines 
 Manang Air
 Nepal Airlines
 Saurya Airlines 
 Simrik Airlines
 Sita Air 
 Shree Airlines
 Tara Air 
 Yeti Airlines

Pakistan

 Airblue
 ASSL
 Pakistan International Airlines
 Princely Jets
 Rayyan Air
 SereneAir

Philippines

 AirSWIFT
 Cebu Pacific
 Cebgo
 Interisland Airlines
 Pacificair
 Pan Pacific Airlines
 Philippine Airlines
 PAL Express
 Philippines AirAsia
 Royal Air Philippines
 SkyJet Airlines
 Sunlight Air

Singapore

 Jetstar Asia Airways
 Singapore Airlines
Scoot
 Tigerair

Sri Lanka

 Air Hybrid
 Cinnamon Air
 FitsAir
 Helitours
 Lankan Cargo
 Millennium Airlines (Simplifly)
 SriLankan Airlines
 Yahapalanaya Airlines
 SriLankan Cargo

Tajikistan
 Somon Air
 Tajik Air

Thailand

 Bangkok Airways
 Nok Air
 Thai AirAsia
 Thai Airways
 Thai Lion Air
 Thai Smile
 Thai Vietjet Air

Timor Leste
See the section above.

Turkmenistan
 Turkmenistan Airlines

Uzbekistan
 Uzbekistan Airways

Vietnam

 Bamboo Airways 
 Pacific Airlines
 VietJet Air
 Vietnam Air Service Company
 Vietnam Airlines
 Vietstar Airlines
 Vietravel Airlines

Australasia and the Pacific
: Top - A B C D E F G H I J K L M N O P Q R S T U V W X Y Z

American Samoa
 Inter Island Airways

Australia

 Air Link
 Airlines of Tasmania
 Airnorth
 Alliance Airlines
 Eastern Australia Airlines
 Jetstar
 Link Airways
 Maroomba Airlines
 National Jet Express
 Network Aviation
 Qantas
 QantasLink
 Queensland Regional Airlines
 Regional Express Airlines
 REX
 Skippers Aviation
 Skytrans Airlines
 Sunstate Airlines
 Virgin Australia
 Virgin Australia Regional Airlines

Cook Islands
 Air Rarotonga

Fiji
 Fiji Airways
 Pacific Island Air
 Pacific Sun

French Polynesia

 Air Tahiti
 Air Tahiti Nui

Guam

Kiribati
 Air Kiribati
 Coral Sun Airways

Marshall Islands
 Air Marshall Islands

Nauru
 Our Airline

New Caledonia
 Air Caledonie
 Aircalin

New Zealand

 Air Chathams
 Air New Zealand
 Aspiring Air

Palau
 Belau Air

Papua New Guinea
 Air Niugini
 Airlines PNG
 Asia Pacific Airlines
 Islands Nationair

Samoa
 Samoa Airways

Solomon Islands
 Solomon Airlines

Vanuatu
 Air Vanuatu

The Caribbean and Central America
 : Top - A B C D E F G H I J K L M N O P Q R S T U V W X Y Z

Anguilla
 Anguilla Air Services
 Trans Anguilla Airways

Aruba

Bahamas
 Bahamasair
 Cat Island Air

Belize
 Maya Island Air
 Tropic Air

British Virgin Islands
 BVI Airways

Cayman Islands
 Cayman Airways

Costa Rica
 Air Charter Service
 Avianca Costa Rica 
 Sansa Airlines
 Volaris Costa Rica

Cuba

 Aerogaviota
 Cubana de Aviación

Curaçao
 E-Liner Airways

Dominican Republic
 Servicios Aéreos Profesionales

El Salvador
 Avianca El Salvador

Guadeloupe

 Air Antilles Express
 Air Caraïbes

Guatemala
 Avianca Guatemala
 Guatemala-Inter

Haiti
 Sunrise Airways

Honduras
 Aerolíneas Sosa
 Avianca Honduras

Jamaica
 Caribbean Airlines
 TimAir

Montserrat
 FlyMontserrat

Nicaragua
 La Costeña

Panama

 Copa Airlines

Puerto Rico
 Culebra Air Services
 Air Flamenco
 Isla Nena Air
 San Juan Aviation
 Vieques Air Link

Saint Barthélemy
 St Barth Commuter

Saint Vincent and the Grenadines
 Mustique Airways
 SVG Air

Sint Maarten
 Winair

Trinidad and Tobago
 Caribbean Airlines

Turks and Caicos Islands
 InterCaribbean Airways

United States Virgin Islands
 Seaborne Airlines
 United Airlines

Europe
 : Top - A B C D E F G H I J K L M N O P Q R S T U V W X Y Z

Albania
 Air Albania
 Albawings

Armenia
 Aircompany Armenia

Austria
 Austrian Airlines
 InterSky
 People's
 Welcome Air

Azerbaijan
 Azerbaijan Airlines
 Buta Airways

Belarus
 Belavia

Belgium
 Brussels Airlines
 TUI fly Belgium

Bulgaria
 BH Air
 Bulgaria Air
 Bulgarian Air Charter

Croatia
 Croatia Airlines
 Trade Air
 Zadar Airlines

Czech Republic
 Blue Air Moravia
 Czech Airlines
 SmartWings

Cyprus
 Cyprus Airways

Denmark
 For Danish territories with home rule, see Faroe Islands and Greenland.
 Air Alsie
 Copenhagen Air Taxi
 Danish Air Transport
 Scandinavian Airlines
 Sun Air of Scandinavia

Estonia

Faroe Islands

 Atlantic Airways

Finland

 Air Åland
 Copterline
 Finnair
 Nordic Regional Airlines

France

For DOMs/TOMs, see the sections for French Guiana, French Polynesia, Guadeloupe, New Caledonia, Réunion, Saint-Pierre and Miquelon.
 Air Corsica
 Air France
 Air France Hop
 ASL Airlines France
 Chalair Aviation
 Corsair International
 Finist'air
 French Bee
 La Compagnie Boutique Airline
 Transavia.com France
 Twin Jet

Georgia
 Georgian Airways
 Georgian National Airlines

Germany

 Aero Dienst
 Avanti Air
 Condor
 Eurowings
 FLN Frisia Luftverkehr
 Lufthansa
 Lufthansa CityLine
 OFD Ostfriesischer-Flug-Dienst
 Private Wings Flugcharter
 Sundair
 Sylt Air
 TUI fly Deutschland
Lufthansa Cargo

Greece

 Aegean Airlines
 Air Mediterranean
 Bluebird Airways
 Olympic Air
 Sky Express

Greenland
 Air Greenland

Guernsey
 Air Alderney

Hungary
 SmartWings Hungary
 Wizz Air

Iceland
 Air Atlanta Icelandic
 Icelandair

Ireland, Republic of
 Aer Lingus
 ASL Airlines Ireland
 CityJet
 Ryanair
 Stobart Air

Italy

 Air Dolomiti
 Air Sal
 Alidaunia
 Alitalia
 Alitalia Cityliner
 Blue Panorama Airlines
 Evolavia
 ITA Airways
 Italia Jet
 Neos

Latvia
 airBaltic
 SmartLynx Airlines

Luxembourg
 Global Jet Luxembourg
 Luxair
 Luxaviation

Malta

 Air Malta
 Freebird Airlines Europe
 Medavia
 Malta Air

Moldova
 Air Moldova

Monaco
 Heli Air Monaco

Netherlands

 Corendon Dutch Airlines
 KLM
 KLM Cityhopper
 Transavia
 TUI fly Netherlands

North Macedonia
 Star Airlines

Norway
 Fonnafly
 Flyr
 Norse Atlantic Airways
 Norwegian Air Norway
 Norwegian Air Shuttle
 Scandinavian Airlines
 Sundt Air
 Widerøe

Poland

 Buzz
 Enter Air
 FlyJet
 IBEX
 LOT Charters
 LOT Polish Airlines
 SkyTaxi
 Sprint Air (formerly Air Polonia Cargo, Sky Express, Direct Fly)

Portugal

 Orbest
 Portugália
 SATA Air Acores
 SATA International
 TAP Portugal
 White

Romania

 Blue Air
 Carpatair
 Jet Tran Air
 TAROM

Russia

 2nd Arkhangelsk Aviation Enterprise
 AeroBratsk
 Aeroflot
 Alrosa-Avia
 Angara Airlines
 Avcom
 Aviastar-TU
 Chukotavia
 Gazpromavia
 Izhavia
 Kazan Air Enterprise
 Komiaviatrans
 NordStar
 Petropavlovsk-Kamchatsky Air Enterprise
 Polet Airlines
 Red Wings Airlines
 Rossiya
 S7 Airlines
 Smartavia
 Ural Airlines
 UTair Aviation
 Volga-Dnepr
 Vologda Aviation Enterprise
 Vostok Aviation Company
 Yakutia Airlines
 Yamal Airlines

Serbia

 Air Serbia
 Airpink

Slovakia
 Aero Slovakia
 AirExplore
 SAM Air
 SmartWings Slovakia

Slovenia
 Solinair

Spain

 Air Este
 Air Europa
 Air Europa Express
 Air Granada
 Air Horizont
 Air Nostrum
 Air Pack Express
 Alaire
 Audeli Air
 Binter Canarias
 BKS Air
 Cygnus Air
 Evelop Airlines 
 Euro Continental Air
 Fly LPI
 FlyAnt
 Iberia
 Iberia Express
 Iberojet
 Ibertrans Aérea
 Naysa Aerotaxis
 OrionAir
 Serair
 Swiftair
 Volotea
 Vueling
 Vuelos Mediterraneo
 Wamos Air
 Zorex Air Transport

Sweden
 Braathens Regional Airways
 Braathens Regional Aviation
 International Business Air
 Kullaflyg
 Norwegian Air Sweden
 Novair
 Scandinavian Airlines
 Snålskjuten
 Stockholmsplanet
 Sunclass Airlines (previously Thomas Cook Scandinavia)
 Sundsvallsflyg
 TUIfly Nordic (previously Britannia Nordic)

Switzerland

 Air Glaciers
 Air Prishtina
 Club Airways International
 Connect Air
 easyJet Switzerland
 Edelweiss Air
 Helvetic Airways
 Jet Aviation
 Ju-Air
 Swiss International Air Lines

Turkey

 AnadoluJet
 Corendon Airlines
 Freebird Airlines
 Pegasus Airlines
 SunExpress
 Turkish Airlines
 Tailwind Airlines
 Southwind Airlines
 Mavigök Airlines
 BBN Airlines

Ukraine

 Air Kharkov
 Air Urga
 Antonov Airlines
 ARP 410 Airlines
 Constanta Airline
 Khors Aircompany
 Motor Sich Airlines
 Podilia-Avia
 Ukraine International Airlines
 Yuzhmashavia

United Kingdom

 Air Atlantique
 Aurigny
 Blue Islands
 British Airways
 Eastern Airways
 easyJet
 Isles of Scilly Skybus
 Jet2.com
 Loganair
 Lydd Air
 Titan Airways
 TUI Airways
 Virgin Atlantic
 Wizz Air UK
 McIntyre Airways

Middle East
 : Top - A B C D E F G H I J K L M N O P Q R S T U V W X Y Z

Bahrain

 Gulf Air

Iran

 Aria Tour
 Ata Airlines
 Atrak Airlines
 Caspian Airlines
 Iran Air
 Iran Aseman Airlines
 Iran Airtours
 Kish Air
 Mahan Air
 Meraj Airlines
 Pouya Air
 Qeshm Air
 Safat Airlines
 Saha Airlines
 Sahand Airlines
 Sepehran Airlines
 Simorgh Airlines
 Taban Airlines
 Tehran Air
 Varesh Airlines
 Zagros Airlines

Iraq

 FlyErbil
 Iraqi Airways

Israel
 Arkia Airlines
 Chim-Nir Aviation
 El Al
 Israir
 Orange Aviation
 Sun D'Or

Jordan

 Jordan Aviation
 Raya Jet
 Royal Jordanian

Kuwait
 Jazeera Airways
 Kuwait Airways

Lebanon

 Lebanese Air Transport
 Middle East Airlines

Oman
 Oman Air
 SalamAir

Qatar

Qatar Airways

Saudi Arabia

 Flyadeal
 Flynas
 Nesma Airlines
 Saudia
 SaudiGulf Airlines

Syria
 Cham Wings Airlines
 FlyDamas
 Kinda Airlines
 Syrian Air

United Arab Emirates

 Abu Dhabi Aviation
 Aerovista Airlines
 Air Arabia
 Aria Air
 Emirates
 Etihad Airways
 Flydubai
 Pluto Airlines
 Reem Air
 Royal Jet
 StarJet
 Wizz Air Abu Dhabi

Yemen
 Felix Airways
 Yemenia

North America
 : Top - A B C D E F G H I J K L M N O P Q R S T U V W X Y Z

Canada

 Air Canada
 Air Canada Express
 Air Canada Jazz
 Air Canada Jetz
 Air Canada Rouge
 Air Creebec
 Air Inuit
 Air Liaison 
 Air North
 Air Nunavut
 Air Saguenay
 Air Tindi
 Air Transat
 Aklak Air
 Alkan Air
 Alta Flights
 Bearskin Airlines
 Buffalo Airways
 Calm Air
 Canada Jetlines
 Canadian Metro Airlines
 Canadian North
 Central Mountain Air
 Canadian Helicopters
 Chorno Aviation 
 Cloud Air 
 Cougar Helicopters
 Exact Air
 Exploits Valley Air Services
 First Air
 Flair Airlines 
 FlyGTA Airlines
 Harbour Air
 HeliJet
 KD Air
 KF Cargo 
 Keewatin Air
 Kenn Borek Air
 Keystone Air Service
 Kivalliq Air 
 Lakeland Aviation
 Nolinor Aviation
 Northwestern Air
 Pacific Coastal Airlines
 PAL Airlines
 Perimeter Aviation
 Porter Airlines
 Prince Edward Air
 R1 Airlines (formerly Regional 1)
 SkyLink Aviation
 SkyLink Express 
 Summit Air
 Sunwest Aviation
 Sunwing Airlines
 Swoop 
 Thunder Airlines
 Tofino Air
 Transwest Air
 Vancouver Island Air
 Voyageur Airways
 Wasaya Airways
 West Coast Air
 West Wind Aviation
 WestJet
 White River Air

Greenland
 Air Greenland

Mexico

 Aero California
 Aero Cuahonte
 Aerolitoral
 Aeromar
 Aeroméxico
 Aeroméxico Connect
 Global Air
 Interjet
 Nova Air
 Republicair
 Servicios Aeronáuticos de Oriente (SARO)
 VivaAerobus
 Volaris

Saint-Pierre and Miquelon
 Air Saint-Pierre

United States
 : Top - A B C D E F G H I J K L M N O P Q R S T U V W X Y Z
 Advanced Air
 Air East
 Air Sunshine
 Air Wisconsin
 Alaska Airlines
 Alaska Central Express
 Allegiant Air
 American Airlines
 American Airlines Shuttle

 American Eagle
 Ameristar Jet Charter
 Avelo Airlines
 *Bemidji Airlines
 Bering Air
 Berry Aviation
 Bighorn Airways
 Big Island Air
 Boutique Air
 Breeze Airways
 Cape Air
 Colorado Airways
 CommutAir
 Contour Airlines
 Crystal Airways
 Delta Air Lines
 Denver Air Connection
 Diamond International Airlines
 Eastern Airlines
 Elite Airways
 Endeavor Air
 Envoy Air
 Everts Air
 FedEx Express
 Flight Express
 Flight International
 Freight Runners Express
 Frontier Airlines
 Frontier Flying Service
 FS Air Service
 Gem Air
 Global Crossing Airlines (GlobalX Airlines)
 GoJet Airlines
 Grand Canyon Airlines
 Grand Canyon Scenic Airlines
 Grant Aviation
 Griffling Flying Service
 Hawaiian Airlines
 Hornet Airlines

 Horizon Air
 iAero Airways
 *I-Jet Caribbean
 Inland Aviation Services
 Island Airways
 JetBlue
 JSX
 Justice Prisoner and Alien Transportation System
 *Kalitta Charters
 Kenmore Air
 Key Lime Air
 Louisiana Airways
 Merlin Airways
 Mesa Airlines
 Mexus Airlines
 Mokulele Airlines
 Nantucket Airlines
 National Airlines
 New England Airlines
 Northern Pacific Airways
 Omni Air International
 Pacific Wings

 Pen Air
 Penobscot Air
 Piedmont Airlines
 Pinnacle Airlines
 PSA Airlines
 Reliant Air
 *Republic Airways
 Salmon Air
 San Juan Airlines
 Servant Air
 Sierra Pacific Airlines
 Silver Airways
 Skagway Air Service
 Sky King Airlines
 Skyway Enterprises
 SkyWest Airlines
 Southern Airways Express
 Southwest Airlines
 Spirit Airlines
 Sportsflight Airways
 Surf Air
 Sun Country Airlines
 Sundance Air
 Sunship1 Airlines
 Superior Aviation
 Taquan Air
 Taos Air
 Tradewind Aviation
 Ultimate Air Shuttle

 United Airlines
 United Express
 Utah Airways
 USA Jet Airlines
 Victory Air Transport
 Wagner Airways
 Warbelow's Air Ventures
 West Air
 Wright Air Service
 Xtra Airways

South America
 : Top - A B C D E F G H I J K L M N O P Q R S T U V W X Y Z

Argentina

 Aerolíneas Argentinas
 Andes Líneas Aéreas
 Baires Fly
 JetSmart Argentina
 LADE

Bolivia
 Boliviana de Aviación
 Línea Aérea Amaszonas

Brazil

 Azul Brazilian Airlines (Azul Linhas Aéreas Brasileiras)
 Gol Transportes Aéreos (English: Gol Intelligent Airline) (Gol Linhas Aéreas Inteligentes)
 LATAM Brasil
 MAP Airlines (MAP Linhas Aéreas)
 Passaredo Airlines (Passaredo Linhas Aéreas)
 ITA Transportes Aéreos

Chile
 Aerocardal
 Aerovías DAP
 JetSmart
 LATAM Chile
 LATAM Express
 Sky Airline

Colombia

 Avianca
 Avianca Express
 EasyFly
 Heliandes
 LATAM Colombia
 SATENA
 Wingo

Ecuador
 Avianca Ecuador
 LATAM Ecuador
 SAEREO

French Guiana
 Air Guyane

Falkland Islands
 Falkland Islands Government Air Service (FIGAS)

Guyana
 Air Services Limited
 Domestic Airways
 Fenix Aviation
 Golden Arrow Airways
 Hinterland Aviation Inc
 Jags Aviation
 Oxford Aviation
 Roraima Airways
 Trans Guyana Airways

Paraguay
 LATAM Paraguay

Peru
 LATAM Perú
 Movil Air
 Saeta Peru
 Star Peru

Suriname
 Blue Wing Airlines
 Surinam Airways

Uruguay

 Aeromas
 Air Class Líneas Aéreas

Venezuela
 Aero Ejecutivos
 Aeropostal Alas de Venezuela
 Avior Airlines
 Conviasa
 LAI - Línea Aérea IAACA
 Rutaca
 Sol America
 Venezolana

See also

 Airline call sign
 Cargo airline
 IATA airline designator
 ICAO airline designator
 List of accidents and incidents on commercial airliners
 Lists of airlines
 List of defunct airlines
 List of largest airlines
 List of low-cost airlines
 List of national airlines

External links

Airlines Passenger
Passenger airlines
Passenger

Passenger Airlines

de:Liste der Fluggesellschaften
pl:Wikiprojekt:Lotnictwo/DNU/Linie Lotnicze